Vipin Singh Parmar (born 15 March 1964) is an Indian politician and member of the Bharatiya Janata Party, who is the current Speaker of the Himachal Pradesh Legislative Assembly.

Biography
Parmar was born in Nanaon village, Kangra district, Himachal Pradesh. He was first elected to the Himachal Pradesh Legislative Assembly in 1998; and subsequently reelected in 2007 and 2017. From December 2017 to February 2020 he served as Minister for Health and Family Welfare in the Jai Ram Thakur ministry. He was elected unopposed as Speaker in February 2020.  He presently represents the Sullah Vidhan Sabha constituency.

References 

Living people
Himachal Pradesh MLAs 2017–2022
1964 births
People from Kangra, Himachal Pradesh